Mark Lukasiewicz (born March 8, 1973) is a former professional baseball pitcher who played two seasons for the Anaheim Angels of Major League Baseball.

Lukasiewicz grew up in Secaucus, New Jersey and graduated from Secaucus High School in 1991 before being inducted into the school's Hall of Fame in 2003.

Drafted by the Toronto Blue Jays in 1993, Lukasiewicz spent from 1994 to 2000 in their minor leagues before signing with the Anaheim Angels in 2001. He made his major league debut at the age of 28 in 2001. He was briefly called up the following year and pitched for two more seasons in the Minors before retiring at the age of 31.

References

External links

1973 births
Living people
Major League Baseball pitchers
Anaheim Angels players
Baseball players from Jersey City, New Jersey
People from Secaucus, New Jersey
American people of Polish descent
Hagerstown Suns players
Dunedin Blue Jays players
Bakersfield Blaze players
Knoxville Smokies players
Syracuse SkyChiefs players
Tennessee Smokies players
Salt Lake Stingers players
Somerset Patriots players
Oklahoma State Cowboys baseball players